The 2000 Brazilian Grand Prix (officially the XXIX Grande Prêmio Marlboro do Brasil) was a Formula One motor race held on 26 March 2000 at the Autódromo José Carlos Pace in São Paulo, Brazil. 72,000 people attended the race, which was the second round of the 2000 Formula One World Championship and the 29th overall edition of the event. Ferrari driver Michael Schumacher won the 71-lap race starting from third position. Giancarlo Fisichella of the Benetton team finished in second and Jordan's Heinz-Harald Frentzen was third.

Mika Häkkinen of the McLaren team took pole position by recording the fastest lap in qualifying. He led on the first lap of the race before World Drivers Championship leader Michael Schumacher passed him at the beginning of lap two. Thereafter, Michael Schumacher opened up a 17.6-second lead before his first of two pit stops for fuel and tyres on lap 20. He retook the lead after Häkkinen retired with a loss of engine oil pressure ten laps later. David Coulthard in the other McLaren gained on Michael Schumacher in the final 12 laps as the latter slowed to manage an oil pressure problem. He was not close enough to make a pass for the win and Michael Schumacher took his second consecutive victory of the season and the 37th of his career.

After the race, Coulthard was disqualified from the second place due to an illegal front wing endplate. McLaren filed an appeal to the Fédération Internationale de l'Automobile's International Court of Appeal, which was rejected. The disqualification advanced every driver behind Coulthard by a single position. The result extended Michael Schumacher's lead atop the World Drivers' Championship to 12 points. Fisichella moved from fifth to second as Rubens Barrichello in the second Ferrari fell to third after not finishing the race. Ferrari further increased their lead in the World Constructors' Championship to 18 points as Benetton advanced from fourth to second with fifteen races remaining in the season.

Background

The 2000 Brazilian Grand Prix was the second of the 17 motor races in the 2000 Formula One World Championship and the 29th overall edition of the event. It took place at the 15-turn  Autódromo José Carlos Pace in the Brazilian city of São Paulo on 26 March. It was the second of six  to be held outside of Europe. The high-altitude, anti-clockwise track had significant elevation changes, placing a heavy load of g-force on the left-hand side of drivers' necks. Teams altered their cars to run at medium to high levels of downforce and the dampers, springs and suspensions were optimised to adapt to the bumpy track surface. Formula One's control tyre supplier Bridgestone brought the soft and the medium dry compound tyres to the race.

After winning the preceding —the first of the 17 World Championship races—Ferrari driver Michael Schumacher led the Drivers' Championship with ten points; his teammate Rubens Barrichello was in second with six points, and Ralf Schumacher of the Williams team had four points. British American Racing's (BAR) Jacques Villeneuve was fourth with three points and Benetton driver Giancarlo Fisichella was fifth with two points. In the Constructors' Championship Ferrari led with a maximum number of 16 points. Williams and BAR tied in third with four points each and Benetton was fourth on four points.

Prior to the event the majority of the 11 teams conducted sessions at various locations across Europe to test their cars and new components. McLaren, Jordan, Williams, Jaguar and Prost elected to test at the Silverstone Circuit in the United Kingdom from 14 to 16 March. Ferrari test driver Luca Badoer performed shakedown runs at the Fiorano Circuit in northern Italy. Olivier Panis of the McLaren test team led on the first two days of testing; on day three, Williams' Jenson Button was the fastest driver. The BAR, Arrows, Sauber and Minardi teams did not test before the Grand Prix.

The press and bookmakers considered Michael Schumacher the favourite to win the race. In response to a statement by McLaren team principal Ron Dennis—who claimed Ferrari was not as competitive as McLaren—Schumacher said he was optimistic over a continuing challenge to McLaren for the rest of the season. McLaren driver David Coulthard stated he foresaw the team starting on the grid's front row and winning, after faulty seals on their pneumatic valve systems forced him and two-time world champion Mika Häkkinen to retire from the preceding Australian Grand Prix: "We weren't beaten fair and square in the race because we dropped out. You have to give Ferrari credit because they won when we dropped out and that's our mistake. But it means we come here believing we are competitive and still have a chance."

Over the month of February, the Autódromo José Carlos Pace was resurfaced in an attempt to reduce its bumpiness. The pit lane exit was moved from the entry of the Senna S chicane to the Repa Opposta straight. A larger run-off area was installed to the outside of Laranjinha turn and its concrete barrier was padded with tyres, after Ricardo Zonta had crashed and been injured during the 1999 race. Charlie Whiting, the Fédération Internationale de l'Automobile (FIA; Formula One's governing body) technical delegate, inspected the circuit and ordered the pit lane barriers to be moved for better driver access. The drivers had mixed feelings over the resurfacing work. Eddie Irvine of the Jaguar team criticised the track's condition. His teammate Johnny Herbert described the bumps approaching the start/finish straight as "horrendous" and raised concerns over a repeat of an accident sustained by Stéphane Sarrazin in 1999. Barrichello and his teammate Michael Schumacher, on the other hand, said the track was better for them.

There were 11 teams (each representing a different constructor) entering two drivers each for the Grand Prix with no changes from the season entry list. Several teams altered their cars, either to refine their aerodynamic appendages or to solve reliability problems that emerged during the Australian Grand Prix. McLaren identified an air filter failure that had the pneumatic valve system problem in the previous race, and modified its design to prevent a recurrence. Ford-Cosworth modified its engine lubrication system and the Arrows team altered the design of the steering linkage. The FIA granted Arrows permission to enter the race after changing the design of the headrests to protect the driver in its A21 car.

Practice
There were four practice sessions preceding Sunday's race, two one-hour sessions on Friday, and two 45-minute sessions on Saturday. The weather was hot and clear for the Friday sessions. Barrichello made minor changes to the aerodynamic setup of his car before the morning session, and was fastest with a 1-minute, 17.631 seconds lap. Häkkinen, Coulthard, Michael Schumacher, Villeneuve, Prost's Jean Alesi, Fisichella, Heinz-Harald Frentzen of the Jordan team, Sauber driver Mika Salo and Arrows' Jos Verstappen rounded out the session's top ten drivers. During the session, Alesi spun three times and removed the front wing on the third occurrence. Michael Schumacher's session ended early after eight laps due to a driveshaft joint leak and Zonta was restricted to four timed laps after debris accumulation overheated his engine. Practice was interrupted when a stray dog ran onto the circuit and was knocked over by marshals in a car.

With three minutes remaining in the afternoon session, Häkkinen bettered his 1999 pole position lap by six-tenths of a second and set the day's fastest lap of 1 minute, 15.896 seconds. Michael Schumacher was second-fastest. Coulthard, Barrichello, Pedro de la Rosa's Arrows, Alesi, Verstappen, Jordan's Jarno Trulli, Villeneuve and Fisichella took third through tenth. A brake and balance problem twice put Ralf Schumacher off the track. Alexander Wurz spun and beached his Benetton in a gravel trap at Mergulho corner. Coulthard spent part of the session in the pit lane as McLaren replaced his front wing after he went into the grass midway through. Verstappen tried a tyre compound that affected his car's setup and put him into a gravel trap at the end of practice.

It continued to be hot and dry for Saturday morning's two practice sessions. Teams tested different ride height setups on their cars, creating a noticeable difference in performance. They also selected the tyre compounds to use for the rest of the weekend. Coulthard led the third practice session with a lap of 1 minute, 15.035 seconds, followed by his teammate Häkkinen, the Ferrari pair of Michael Schumacher and Barrichello, Frentzen, Fisichella, Trulli, Irvine, Minardi's Marc Gené and Alesi. During the session, an engine problem for Michael Schumacher prompted his team to spend an hour and ten minutes changing it. An oil leak in Gastón Mazzacane's Minardi restricted him to five timed laps, and prevented his participation in the final practice session later that day.

Hakkinen led the fourth session with a 1-minute, 14.159 seconds time on his final lap on a new set of tyres, with his teammate Coulthard third. They were separated by Barrichello. His teammate Michael Schumacher was fourth. Trulli was fifth and Fisichella duplicated his third practice result in sixth. Villeneuve, Verstappen, Ralf Schumacher, and Frentzen completed the top ten. Barrichello spun twice as he tested a new rear wing, one of which was caused by a broken footrest. Frentzen and his teammate Trulli ran into a gravel trap and both sustained minor bodywork damage to their cars. Zonta lost track time due to a gearbox actuator fault and ran into a gravel trap. Button's engine failed, laying oil on the racing line between the Laranjinha and Bico do Pato corners. Salo's rear wing failed on the start/finish straight; he spun as he braked before the Senna S chicane and crashed into the wall, but was unhurt.

Qualifying

Saturday afternoon's one-hour qualifying session saw drivers circulate the track simultaneously. Each driver was limited to twelve laps; their fastest laps would determine the starting order for the race. During this session the 107% rule was in effect, requiring each driver to remain within 107 per cent of the fastest lap to qualify for the race. Heavy rain fell in the session's final  hour and the resulting slippery track prevented drivers from improving their best laps. The session was stopped three times because a heavy wind caused a  gantry-mounted cardboard advertising hoarding, joined by nylon ties above the start/finish straight, to detach and fall  onto the track. Häkkinen went fastest with 15 minutes to go before the rain fell with a 1-minute, 14.111 seconds lap, earning his second consecutive pole position, and the 23rd of his career. Häkkinen's teammate Coulthard was second and the Ferrari duo of Michael Schumacher and Barrichello took third and fourth; Schumacher understeered into the grass on his second timed lap, damaging his car's undertray on the corrugations of a high-mounted kerb. He drove the spare Ferrari for the rest of qualifying. Barrichello had to abort a fast lap due to the stoppage. Fisichella, fifth, praised his car's handling. Irvine in sixth was happy with his Jaguar's grip and balance.

Frentzen qualified seventh after Pedro Diniz slowed him. Zonta, eighth, focused on aerodynamic setup to improve his car's handling. Button switched his engine between the final practice session and qualifying and worked to change the setup of his car with his race engineer Tim Preston. He was fourth early on before falling to ninth. Villeneuve qualified in tenth as traffic slowed two of his timed laps and he ran onto the grass. Ralf Schumacher was the fastest driver not to qualify in the top ten after different spring rates failed to improve the setup of his chassis. Trulli spun into a gravel trap at the Bico de Peto hairpin on his first timed lap. He returned to the pit lane to drive the spare Jordan car; an electronic control unit fault affected its gear selection and left him 12th. Traffic slowed all of Wurz's laps and left him in 13th. Clutch issues left Verstappen in 14th. Alesi was unhurt. De La Rosa in 16th was slowed by the rain. Car setup issues put Herbert 17th. Gené in 18th ventured onto the track early in the session. Nick Heidfeld used the spare Prost car to secure 19th due to a clutch failure in his race car. Diniz in 20th had a similar rear wing failure to his teammate Salo in 22nd. Fuel pressure problems led Mazzacane to drive the spare Minardi car; he separated the Sauber duo in 21st.

Post-qualifying
During the second stoppage, Sauber announced its withdrawal from the race, citing a lack of time in Brazil to analyse and rectify the structural integrity of the rear wings on both their cars. The team returned to their Hinwil headquarters and found the track's bumpy surface resulted in both of their cars having higher than anticipated impact loads; Salo had a failure of the lower plane on his rear wing and Diniz's failed on the upper plane.

Qualifying classification

Notes:

 Sauber withdrew Pedro Diniz and Mika Salo on the grounds of safety due to separate rear wing failures on their cars.

Warm-up

A 30-minute warm-up session was held on Sunday morning in hot and overcast weather. All drivers fine-tuned their race set-ups and drove their spare cars. Häkkinen set the session's fastest lap at 1 minute, 16.343 seconds, ahead of Michael Schumacher, Coulthard, Barrichello, Verstappen, Ralf Schumacher, Gené, Fisichella and Zonta in positions two to ten. Ten minutes in, Wurz stalled his car at the exit of the pit lane, and the session was stopped. He required the spare Benetton B200 car for the rest of the session. Alesi's engine failed and he switched to the spare Prost AP03, which had a rear wing failure on the bumpy start/finish straight, and caused a second stoppage.

After the warm-up session, and before the race, Prost examined Alesi's rear wing and found that its failure was due to older bodywork parts fitted to his car and readied its spare chassis if required. The team stated they were unconcerned over the safety of their drivers and confirmed their participation in the event.

Race
The race began at 14:00 local time. The weather at the start was hot and dry with the ambient temperature , the track temperature , and the humidity at 76 per cent. Approximately 72,000 spectators attended the race, most of whom were supporting Ferrari. Computer simulations suggested that drivers who made one pit stop would record the fastest overall race times. On the formation lap, Wurz stalled his engine, and his stationary car delayed Alesi and Herbert; both drivers took up their starting positions. Wurz began the event from the pit lane. Häkkinen made a brisk start from the grid to lead the field going into the Senna S chicane. Coulthard, in second, had wheelspin and was passed by Michael Schumacher, who unsuccessfully challenged Häkkinen for the lead. Coulthard retained third as Barrichello made a slow start. Behind them, Irvine overtook Fisichella for fifth. Verstappen moved from 14th to 11th by the conclusion of the first lap; Button fell from 9th to 14th over the same distance. Trulli passed Ralf Schumacher and Villeneuve to progress into tenth on the left of the circuit.

As the first two drivers reached the start/finish line, Michael Schumacher, who was close behind Häkkinen throughout lap one, steered off the racing line to pass the latter for the lead heading into the Senna S chicane. Barrichello slipstreamed Coulthard on the start/finish straight and overtook him for third. He then ran wide and Coulthard retook third. Barrichello retook the position by the end of lap two as Coulthard lost the use of the first three gears due to a gearbox fault and was slower in the slow-speed corners. Coulthard was unable to inform McLaren of the issue due to a malfunctioning radio. At the front, Michael Schumacher extended his lead over Häkkinen to four seconds by lap four and to 15 seconds by lap 15 with a series of fastest laps. In the meantime, Trulli passed Zonta for eighth, Button overtook Alesi for 13th and Heidfeld lost 16th to de la Rosa. Verstappen progressed from 11th to seventh bypassing Villeneuve, Zonta, Frentzen, and Fisichella as Alesi overtook Ralf Schumacher, Villeneuve, Zonta, and Frentzen to advance to ninth. Three drivers retired from the race during this period: Wurz and Heidfeld had separate engine failures on lap seven and nine and Alesi stopped with an electrical failure at the Bico de Pato hairpin on lap 11.

At the end of lap 14, Barrichello drew close to Häkkinen after the latter ran wide. He slipstreamed Häkkinen and turned left to pass him for second as he braked before the Senna S chicane to start the 15th lap. De la Rosa passed Herbert for 14th on that lap and Trulli overtook Irvine for fifth on lap 16. That lap, Villeneuve retired with a race-long gearbox problem. The Ferrari and McLaren teams employed different pit stop strategies – the Ferrari team planned for two stops in the anticipation they would build up a large enough lead over McLaren on the circuit. The McLaren squad, however, scheduled a single pit stop because they theorised that the long length of the pit lane would cost them time. Michael Schumacher led by 17.6 seconds over the rest of the field when he commenced the first round of pit stops for fuel and tyres four laps later. He rejoined the track in third and Barrichello led the next two laps until his stop. On lap 21, Irvine lost control of the rear of his car entering the Bico de Pato hairpin and crashed into a tyre barrier. Six laps later, Barrichello entered the pit lane with a hydraulic motor problem that spread from the steering wheel to the throttle linkage. As Barrichello exited the car to retire a small fire was extinguished by his mechanics.

Trulli made the first of two stops from fourth at the end of the 28th lap and he emerged in seventh. At the front of the field, Häkkinen pulled away to lead Michael Schumacher by 12 seconds until he slowed with a loss of oil engine pressure on the 30th lap. He slowed and retired in his garage. Michael Schumacher retook the lead, with the yet-to-stop Coulthard second, Verstappen third, and Fisichella fourth. Coulthard lapped to within a tenth of a second of Michael Schumacher as the latter slowed slightly due to an imbalance in all four of his tyres as Ralf Schumacher challenged Fisichella for fourth. On lap 32, Gené retired from eleventh with an engine failure. Verstappen and his teammate de la Rosa made their first pit stops on laps 35 and 37. Four laps later, Frentzen was the first driver on a one-stop strategy to enter the pit lane. Coulthard made his only stop on lap 43 and remained in second position. Michael Schumacher led by 48 seconds when he made his second pit stop on the 51st lap and retained the lead. On the same lap, Fisichella made his only stop and kept third place.

On lap 51, Herbert retired in the pit lane with a gearbox failure. De la Rosa lost concentration and went into a gravel trap four laps later. He rejoined without losing position. Button battled Verstappen for several laps and overtook him for seventh on the 56th lap, as Trulli made a pit stop from fourth and rejoined the track in fifth. From the 59th lap, Coulthard began to gain on Michael Schumacher, who slowed due to an oil pressure problem. Coulthard followed 4.302 seconds later and Fisichella took third. Frentzen drove consistently to finish fourth, Trulli's two-stop strategy enabled him to finish fifth and Ralf Schumacher was the last of the points-scorers in sixth. Button, Verstappen, de la Rosa, Zonta and Mazzacane (in his first F1 race finish) were the final finishers. The attrition rate was high; only 11 of the 20 starters finished the race.

Post-race
The top three drivers appeared on the podium to collect their trophies and spoke to the media at a later press conference. Michael Schumacher, who received the winners' trophy from Brazilian footballer Pelé, stated that pit stop strategy helped him to win the race: "In the past, as you may remember, we could not overtake the McLaren entries, regardless of their strategy. Now we are looking a lot more competitive – which is where we wanted to be – and the season could hardly have started better than it has." Coulthard said his second-place finish provided him the start to his championship campaign after his gearbox problems: "It must have been entertaining for those who had places to watch at the first corner. Given the circumstances, I am very happy with my six points." Fisichella revealed that his car had understeer and oversteer for the first 15 laps until its grip and balance improved. Nonetheless, he said he was pleased to finish third, "This is a great result and will help us to be even more competitive in the future. I am confident about the next race when we will have some new aerodynamic parts."

Approximately one hour after the race finish when the cars were subject to post-race checks at the FIA scrutineering bay by officials, all of the top six finishers, except for Fisichella, were found to have excess wear on the wooden planks attached to the floors underneath their cars, in violation of a regulation concerning illegal plank wear. The Ferrari, McLaren, Jordan and Williams teams filed a successful appeal as the bumpy racing surface caused the wear due to cars bottoming out. All four teams were reinstated after a second inspection caused a  hour delay. Bauer deemed this to have provided Coulthard with a competitive aerodynamic advantage and the stewards disqualified the driver six hours after the race. The technical director of McLaren Adrian Newey rejected an offer from the stewards to transport Coulthard's car to Paris for a fair hearing and agreed to a set of four measurements in São Paulo. McLaren filed an appeal, saying the car's undertray and chassis was damaged and shifted by vibrations from the bumps on the racing surface. On 4 April, the appeal was heard by a five-man panel at a meeting of the FIA International Court of Appeal in Paris. They rejected McLaren's appeal in the 90-minute hearing and declared the race result final.

This promoted every driver behind Coulthard one position; Button was reclassified sixth and became the youngest driver to score a Formula One World Championship point at the age of 20 years, 2 months, 7 days old, breaking Ricardo Rodríguez's record from the 1962 Belgian Grand Prix. On 6 April, the organisers of the Brazilian Grand Prix were summoned to a meeting of the FIA General Assembly. They were fined $100,000 for the track's safety issues and for the three times qualifying was stopped for falling advertising hoardings. The governing body ruled it as "exceptional circumstances" and allowed the track to remain in Formula One. The president of the FIA Max Mosley said an increased fine or cancelling the race was not imposed because its organisers had submitted evidence to prevent either action from occurring, "Bearing in mind that we allowed the Brazilian promoters to place the signs there – and they probably didn't know what potential there was for the failures which occurred – it seemed only fair to impose the comparatively modest penalty."

Häkkinen limited his interviews with the media and left the circuit before the race concluded; he spoke of his disappointment over retiring from the lead of the race, "Nothing can describe how I feel, We have been quick all weekend, right the way through, so I am not happy to be leaving Brazil without any points. We have some work to do before the start of the European season." Button was quoted in the press as saying he preferred to score points in the race and not in a court of appeal, "I heard the news about David as I was making my way to the airport to fly back from Brazil – and I can't say it gave me any great feeling of joy. You want to earn any success through your driving skills, not someone else's misfortune." Eddie Jordan, the owner of the Jordan team, said that both his cars finishing the event demonstrated they could last a full race distance after retiring from the Australian Grand Prix with mechanical issues. Frentzen stated it was as if the team's season had commenced in Brazil and required maintenance to improve their performance, "But we are a very strong team with a good atmosphere, I get along well with Jarno and everything is fine so far."

The gap in the Drivers' Championship after the race stood at 12 points in favour of Michael Schumacher with Fisichella moving from fifth to second as a result of his second-place finish. Barrichello dropped to third and Ralf Schumacher fell to fourth. Frentzen rounded out the top five. In the Constructors' Championship, Ferrari moved further ahead with 26 points and the Benetton team progressed from fourth to second. Jordan's first points of the season put them third while Williams and BAR were fourth and fifth with fifteen races left in the season.

Race classification
Drivers who scored championship points are denoted in bold.

Championship standings after the race
Note, only the top five positions are included for both sets of standings.

Drivers' Championship standings

Constructors' Championship standings

Notes and references

Notes

References

Brazilian Grand Prix
Brazilian Grand Prix
Grand Prix
Brazilian Grand Prix